The dusky-tailed flatbill (Ramphotrigon fuscicauda) is a species of bird in the family Tyrannidae. It is found in Bolivia, Brazil, Colombia, Ecuador, and Peru.

Its natural habitat is subtropical or tropical moist lowland forests.

References

dusky-tailed flatbill
Birds of the Amazon Basin
Birds of the Ecuadorian Amazon
Birds of the Peruvian Amazon
Birds of the Bolivian Amazon
dusky-tailed flatbill
Taxonomy articles created by Polbot